The Oklahoma State Cowboys football program is a college football team that represents Oklahoma State University–Stillwater as part of the Big 12 Conference in the National Collegiate Athletic Association. The team has had 22 head coaches since organized football began in 1901 with the nickname Aggies. The team played without a head coach until 1906. The university, then known as Oklahoma Agricultural and Mechanical College, was renamed Oklahoma State University in 1957 and its nickname was changed to Cowboys. Oklahoma State was an original member of the Southwest Conference, joining in 1915. They later joined the Missouri Valley Conference in 1925 and the Big Eight Conference in 1960. The Cowboys became a charter member of the Big 12 in 1996. The Cowboys have played in more than 1,000 games during their 108 seasons. In those seasons, eight coaches have led the Cowboys to postseason bowl games: Jim Lookabaugh, Cliff Speegle, Jim Stanley, Jimmy Johnson, Pat Jones, Bob Simmons, Les Miles and Mike Gundy. Six coaches have won conference championships with the Cowboys: John Maulbetsch, Lynn Waldorf, Lookabaugh, Stanley, and Gundy.

Gundy is the all-time leader in games coached (138), wins (94) and years coached (14), while Waldorf is the all-time leader in winning percentage (.735). Theodore Cox finished his career with a .250 winning percentage, the worst in team history. Of the 22 Cowboy coaches, Waldorf and Johnson have been inducted in the College Football Hall of Fame. Three coaches are also graduates of the university: Lookabaugh, Floyd Gass, and Gundy. The first coach was F. A. McCoy, who serviced only one season, in 1905. The current coach, Mike Gundy, was hired in January 2005.

Coaches
Updated through 2022 season

Key

Notes

References
General
 
 

Specific

Lists of college football head coaches
Oklahoma sports-related lists